Beauce la Romaine (literally Beauce the Roman) is a commune in the Loir-et-Cher department of central France. The municipality was established on 1 January 2016 by merger of the former communes of Ouzouer-le-Marché (the seat), La Colombe, Membrolles, Prénouvellon, Semerville, Tripleville and Verdes.

See also 
Communes of the Loir-et-Cher department

References 

Communes of Loir-et-Cher